The 1960 Polish Speedway season was the 1960 season of motorcycle speedway in Poland.

Individual

Polish Individual Speedway Championship
The 1960 Individual Speedway Polish Championship was held on 28 August at Rybnik.

Team

Team Speedway Polish Championship
The 1960 Team Speedway Polish Championship was the 13th edition of the Team Polish Championship. Stal Rzeszów won the gold medal.

First League

Second League (East)

Second League (West)

Play off
Sparta Wrocław v Wanda Nowa Huta 46–32, 49-29

References

Poland Individual
Poland Team
Speedway